Eriocottis is a genus of moths in the Eriocottidae family.

Species
 Eriocottis andalusiella Rebel, 1901
 Eriocottis flavicephalana Issiki, 1930
 Eriocottis fuscanella Zeller, 1847
 Eriocottis hispanica Zagulajev, 1988
 Eriocottis maraschensis Rebel, 1936
 Eriocottis nicolaeella Gibeaux, 1983
 Eriocottis paradoxella (Staudinger, 1859)
 Eriocottis pyrocoma Meyrick, 1891

Former species
 Eriocottis nodicornella Rebel, 1911
 Eriocottis recticostella Caradja, 1920

References

Eriocottidae